Pristimantis shrevei is a species of frog in the family Strabomantidae. It is endemic to Saint Vincent, the West Indies. Its common name is Saint Vincent frog.

Etymology
The specific name, shrevei, is in honor of American herpetologist Benjamin Shreve.

Geographic range and habitat
P. shrevei is endemic to Saint Vincent, an island in the Caribbean Lesser Antilles that is part of Saint Vincent and the Grenadines. It lives both on the ground and on vegetation.

Description
Males measure  and females  in snout–vent length. P. shrevei has a rich wood-brown to rich tan dorsum. There is a dark interocular bar bordering the snout; otherwise the dorsal patterning varies, some individuals are patternless whereas others have a broad dark brown scapular "W" and other patterns. The ventral surface is creamy. The sides are red, as are the undersides of both fore- and hindlimbs.

The call is a two-note call, emitted from the leaves of trees and shrubs.

Conservation status
P. shrevei is threatened by habitat loss caused by urbanization, tourism development, and agriculture.

References

Further reading
Kaiser H, Hardy JD Jr, Green DM. 1994. Taxonomic status of Caribbean and South American frogs currently ascribed to Eleutherodactylus urichi (Anura: Leptodactylidae). Copeia 1994: 780-796. (Eleutherodactylus shrevei).
.
Schwartz A, Thomas R. 1975. A Check-list of West Indian Amphibians and Reptiles. Carnegie Museum of Natural History Special Publication No. 1. Pittsburgh, Pennsylvania: Carnegie Museum of Natural History. 216 pp. (Eleutherodactylus urichi shrevei, p. 38).

shrevei
Amphibians described in 1967
Amphibians of the Caribbean
Fauna of Saint Vincent and the Grenadines
Endemic fauna of Saint Vincent and the Grenadines
Taxa named by Albert Schwartz (zoologist)
Taxonomy articles created by Polbot